Louis Patsalides (Greek: Λουής Πατσαλίδης‎; born 23 October 1980) is a Cypriot stand up comedian, television presenter of the Louis Night Show and radio host. He was a spokesperson for the Eurovision Song Contest 2021.

References

Cypriot television presenters
1980 births
Living people